The 1977 Sun Belt Conference men's basketball tournament was held February 27–March 11 at a combination of on-campus gymnasiums and the Charlotte Coliseum in Charlotte, North Carolina. This was the first edition of the tournament.

UNC Charlotte defeated  in the championship game, 71–70, to win their first Sun Belt men's basketball tournament.

The 49ers, in turn, received an automatic bid to the 1977 NCAA tournament, where they defeated Central Michigan, Syracuse, and Michigan on their way to the Final Four before falling to eventual-champions Marquette.

Format
All six of the conference's members participated in the tournament field. They were seeded based on regular season conference records with the top two teams earning byes to the semifinal round.
Quarter-Final games were played at the campus gym of the higher-seeded team. The Semi-Finals and Championship game, meanwhile, were played at the Charlotte Coliseum in Charlotte, North Carolina.

Bracket

References

Tournament
Sun Belt Conference men's basketball tournament
College sports in North Carolina
Basketball competitions in Charlotte, North Carolina
Sun Belt Conference men's basketball tournament
Sun Belt Conference men's basketball tournament
Sun Belt Conference men's basketball tournament